Teretrurus rhodogaster is a species of nonvenomous shield tail snake, endemic to the Western Ghats of India. It is known as Wall's shield tail snake, Palni Mountain burrowing snake, or red-bellied shieldtail.

It is perhaps the smallest species of shield tail snake, with adults barely exceeding .

Geographic range
It is found in South India, in the Western Ghats encompassing the Palni Hills (Shembaganur in Kodaikanal Hills, Palnis).

The type locality given is "Palnai Hills."

References

Further reading

External links

Uropeltidae
Endemic fauna of India
Reptiles of India
Snakes of Asia
Taxa named by Frank Wall
Reptiles described in 1921
Taxobox binomials not recognized by IUCN